Pima occidentalis is a species of snout moth. It is found in the south-western United States.

There are two generations per year in Texas, New Mexico and Arizona.

The larvae feed on Astragalus species, including Astragalus allochrous, Astragalus thurberi and Astragalus wootonii, as well as Lathyrus species. Young larvae bore into developing legumes at the base and cover the opening with white silk. They feed on the seeds. If all seeds of a legume are consumed, a larva may move to another.  The larvae have a greenish white to white body and a pale brownish yellow head. They reach a length of 13.1-20.5 mm. Pupation takes place under debris on the soil, usually after overwintering in a hibernaculum.

Taxonomy
Pima occidentalis was formerly treated as a subspecies of Pima albiplagiatella.

References

Moths described in 1956
Phycitini
Pima (moth)